Events in the year 1959 in the Republic of India.

Incumbents
 President of India – Rajendra Prasad
 Prime Minister of India – Jawaharlal Nehru
 Vice President of India – Sarvepalli Radhakrishnan
 Chief Justice of India – Sudhi Ranjan Das (until 30 Sep.), Bhuvaneshwar Prasad Sinha (starting 1 Oct.)

Governors
 Andhra Pradesh – Bhim Sen Sachar 
 Assam – 
 until 22 August: Saiyid Fazal Ali 
 23 August-14 October: Chandreswar Prasad Sinha 
 starting 14 October: Satyavant Mallannah Shrinagesh
 Bihar – Zakir Hussain 
 Karnataka – Jayachamarajendra Wadiyar 
 Kerala – Burgula Ramakrishna Rao 
 Madhya Pradesh – Hari Vinayak Pataskar
 Maharashtra – Sri Prakasa
 Odisha – Yeshwant Narayan Sukthankar 
 Punjab – Narahar Vishnu Gadgil 
 Rajasthan – Gurumukh Nihal Singh 
 Uttar Pradesh – Kanhaiyalal Maneklal Munshi 
 West Bengal – Padmaja Naidu

Events
 National income - 161,017 million
 March 31 - India grants political asylum to the Dalai Lama after he fled Tibet and crossed into Indian territory following 1959 Tibetan uprising.
 April 10 - An English Electric Canberra jet bomber of Indian Air Force that crossed into Pakistani Airspace was shot down near Rawalpindi by Pakistan Air Force's Sabre jets.
 May 1 - President of India Rajendra Prasad gave assent for Reserve Bank of India (Amendment) Act 1959 which created provision for introduction of External Rupee (Gulf Rupee and Hajj Rupee) for using as tender in Trucial States, Oman, Qatar etc. The move is meant to curb the misuse of Indian rupee by gold smugglers.
 July 31 - The EMS ministry, an elected communist government in Kerala brought down through President's rule following Vimochana Samaram.

Dates unknown 

 Bajaj Auto obtains license from Government of India to manufacture two- and three-wheelers in India.

Law 
 Eighth Amendment of the Constitution of India

Births
3 January – Ninong Ering, politician and member of parliament from Arunachal East.
6 January – Kapil Dev, cricketer.
25 June  Suresh Krissna, film director.
29 July – Sanjay Dutt, actor.
29 August  Nagarjuna, actor and film producer.
19 December – H. D. Kumaraswamy, politician and Chief Minister of Karnataka.

Deaths
1 November – M. K. Thyagaraja Bhagavathar, actor and Carnatic singer (born 1909).
4 December – Ahmad Saeed Dehlavi, freedom fighter and first general secretary of the Jamiat Ulama-e-Hind. (born 1888)

See also 
 List of Bollywood films of 1959

References

 
India
Years of the 20th century in India